Anekere is a village in the southern state of Karnataka, India. It is located in the Channarayapatna taluk of Hassan district. The village has a Chennakeshava temple built during the Hoysala Empire.

Gallery
 The car festival of Anekere amma is celebrate at 2nd Tuesday after ugadi festival.it is very big fair with three ratha one from anekere and other two from neighbour villages

See also
 Hassan District
 Districts of Karnataka

References

External links
  Anekere as per Government of India website.

Villages in Hassan district